Gabriella (minor planet designation: 355 Gabriella) is a typical Main belt asteroid.

It was discovered by Auguste Charlois on 20 January 1893 in Nice and named after French astronomer Gabrielle Renaudot Flammarion.

References

External links 
 
 

000355
Discoveries by Auguste Charlois
Named minor planets
000355
18930120